The 31st Toronto International Film Festival ran from September 7 to September 16, 2006. Opening the festival was Zacharias Kunuk and Norman Cohn's The Journals of Knud Rasmussen, a film that "explores the history of the  through the eyes of a father and daughter."

In a press release dated June 27, 2006, twenty-six international film selections were announced which previously premiered at major film festivals worldwide. Of the films announced, twenty-five of them will receive their North American premiere.

Among the many anticipated films were Babel by Alejandro González Iñárritu, Volver by Pedro Almodóvar, Election 2 (a.k.a.  Triad Election) by Johnnie To, The Fountain by Darren Aronofsky and The Host by Bong Joon-ho.

Bella took top prize at the 2006 Toronto International Film Festival by winning the highly coveted "People's Choice Award", a distinction which puts them in the company of such Oscar-winning films as Chariots of Fire, American Beauty, Life Is Beautiful, Crouching Tiger, Hidden Dragon and Hotel Rwanda. Last year's winner of the "People's Choice" Award, Tsotsi, won an Oscar for best foreign-language film.

Bella marks the feature directorial debut for Alejandro Monteverde, who also co-wrote its original screenplay with Patrick Million. Bella features Manuel Perez, Angélica Aragón, Jaime Terelli and Ali Landry. Bella was produced by Sean Wolfington, Eduardo Verastegui, Leo Severino, Alejandro Monteverde and Denise Pinckley and executive produced by J. Eustace Wolfington, Ana Wolfington and Stephen McEveety. The film was financed by producers Sean Wolfingtonand Eustace Wolfington. McEveety (Braveheart, We Were Soldiers, Passion of the Christ) consulted on the script and signed on as an Executive Producer to help market the movie. Bella is McEveety's first release under his nascent Mpower Films moniker and marks his first feature since ankling Mel Gibson's Icon productions.

Awards
Awards presented during the film festival included:
 The People's Choice Award, presented to Alejandro Gomez Monteverde's Bella.
 The Diesel Discovery Award, presented to Joachim Trier's Reprise.
 The Fipresci Prize, presented to Gabriel Range's Death of a President.
 The Citytv Award for Best Canadian First Feature, presented to Noël Mitrani's On the Trail of Igor Rizzi (Sur la trace d'Igor Rizzi).
 The Toronto – City Award for Best Canadian Feature Film, presented to Jennifer Baichwal's documentary Manufactured Landscapes.
 The Short Cuts Canada Award, presented to Maxime Giroux for his short film Les Jours.
 The Swarovski Cultural Innovation Award, presented to Özer Kýzýltan's TAKVA - A Man's Fear of God.

Gala Presentations
 After the Wedding (Denmark/Sweden) Susanne Bier
 All the King's Men (USA) Steven Zaillian
 Amazing Grace (UK/USA) Michael Apted
 Away from Her (Canada) Sarah Polley
 Babel (USA) Alejandro González Iñárritu
 The Banquet (China) Feng Xiaogang
 Black Book (Netherlands) Paul Verhoeven
 Bobby (USA) Emilio Estevez
 Bonneville (USA) Christopher N. Rowley
 Breaking and Entering (USA) Anthony Minghella
 Dixie Chicks: Shut Up and Sing (USA) Barbara Kopple, Cecilia Peck
 For Your Consideration (USA) Christopher Guest
 A Good Year (UK) Ridley Scott
 Infamous (USA) Douglas McGrath
 The Journals of Knud Rasmussen (Canada/Denmark) Zacharias Kunuk, Norman Cohn
 Mon Meilleur Ami (France) Patrice Leconte
 Never Say Goodbye (India) Karan Johar
 Penelope (USA/UK/Germany) Mark Palansky
 Volver (Spain) Pedro Almodóvar
 The White Planet (Canada/France) Thierry Piantanida, Thierry Ragobert, Jean Lemire

Special Presentations
 10 Items or Less (USA) Brad Silberling
 Alatriste (Spain) Agustín Díaz Yanes
 Begone Dull Care (Canada) Norman McLaren, Evelyn Lambart 
 Bernard and Doris (USA) Bob Balaban
 Blinkity Blank (Canada) Norman McLaren
 Brand Upon the Brain! (Canada/USA) Guy Maddin
 The Bubble (Israel) Eytan Fox
 Catch a Fire (United Kingdom/South Africa/USA) Phillip Noyce
 A Chairy Tale (Canada) Norman McLaren, Claude Jutra
 Congorama (Canada) Philippe Falardeau 
 Das Leben der Anderen (Germany) Florian Henckel von Donnersmarck
 The Dog Problem (USA) Scott Caan
 El Cantante (USA) Leon Ichaso
 Exiled (Hong Kong) Johnnie To
 The Fall (India/UK/USA) Tarsem Singh
 Fay Grim (USA/Germany) Hal Hartley
 The Fountain (USA) Darren Aronofsky
 Golden Door (Italy/France) Emanuele Crialese
 Hana (Japan) Hirokazu Koreeda
 Hen Hop (Canada) Norman McLaren
 L'Homme De Sa Vie (France/Italy) Zabou Breitman
 Horizontal Lines (Canada) Norman McLaren, Evelyn Lambart
 Jindabyne (Australia) Ray Lawrence
 Kabul Express (India) Kabir Khan
 The Last King of Scotland (UK) Kevin Macdonald
 The Last Kiss (USA) Tony Goldwyn
 Little Children (USA) Todd Field
 Love and Other Disasters (France/UK) Alek Keshishian
 The Magic Flute (UK) Kenneth Branagh
 Manufactured Landscapes (Canada) Jennifer Baichwal
 Le Merle (Canada) Norman McLaren
 Mon Colonel (France/Algeria/Belgium) Laurent Herbiet
 The Namesake  (USA) Mira Nair
 Neighbours (Canada) Norman McLaren
 Nue Propriete (Belgium/France) Joachim Lafosse
 Opening Speech (Canada) Norman McLaren
 Pan's Labyrinth (Spain) Guillermo del Toro
 Paris, Je T'aime Bruno Podalydes, Gurinder Chadha, Gus Van Sant, Joel Coen, Ethan Coen, Walter Salles, Daniela Thomas, Christopher Doyle, Isabel Coixet, Nobuhiro Suwa, Sylvain Chomet, Alfonso Cuaron, Olivier Assayas, Oliver Schmitz, Richard LaGravenese, Vincenzo Natali, Wes Craven, Tom Tykwer, Frederic Auburtin, Gerard Depardieu, Alexander Payne
 Pas de Deux (Canada) Norman McLaren  
 The Pleasure of Your Company (USA) Michael Ian Black
 The Postmodern Life of My Aunt (China) Ann Hui
 Quelques Jours en Septembre (France) Santiago Amigorena 
 Seraphim Falls (USA) David Von Ancken
 Snow Cake (Canada/UK) Marc Evans
 Stars and Stripes (Canada) Norman McLaren
 Stranger Than Fiction (USA) Marc Forster
 Synchromy (Canada) Norman McLaren
 This Is England (UK) Shane Meadows
 A Crime (France) Manuel Pradal
 Venus (UK) Roger Michell
 Vince Vaughn's Wild West Comedy Show (USA) Ari Sandel
 Woman on the Beach (South Korea) Hong Sang-soo

Masters
 The Wind That Shakes the Barley (France/Ireland/UK/Italy/Spain/Germany) Ken Loach
 The Caiman (Italy) Nanni Moretti
 Lights In The Dusk (Finland/Germany/France) Aki Kaurismäki
 The Optimists (Serbia)

Real to Reel
 Blindsight (United Kingdom) Lucy Walker
 These Girls (Egypt) Tahani Rached
 Remembering Arthur (Canada) Martin Lavut
 Shame (Pakistan/USA) Mohammed Naqvi

Discovery
 Bliss (China) Sheng Zhimin
 Reprise (Norway) Joachim Trier
 Vanaja (India/USA) Rajnesh Domalpalli
 Out of the Blue (New Zealand) Robert Sarkies
 Sharkwater (Canada) Rob Stewart

Visions
 Flandres (France) Bruno Dumont
 Big Bang Love, Juvenile A (Japan) Takashi Miike
 Ten Canoes (Australia) Rolf de Heer
 Taxidermia (Hungary/Austria/France) György Pálfi
 Bamako (France/Mali/USA) Abderrahmane Sissako
 Time (South Korea) Kim Ki-duk

Contemporary World Cinema
 The Last Winter (USA/Iceland) Larry Fessenden
 Red Road (UK) Andrea Arnold
 12:08 East of Bucharest (Romania) Corneliu Porumboiu
 Invisible Waves (Thailand/Netherlands/Hong Kong) Pen-Ek Ratanaruang
 To Get to Heaven, First You Have to Die (France/Germany/Switzerland/Tajikistan) Djamshed Usmonov
 White Palms (Hungary) Szabolcs Hajdu
 Summer Palace (China/France) Lou Ye
 Summer '04 (Germany) Stefan Krohmer
 The Bothersome Man (Norway) Jens Lien
 Retrieval (Poland) Slawomir Fabicki
 Cronica De Una Fuga (Argentina) Israel Adrián Caetano
 Slumming (Austria/Switzerland) Michael Glawogger
 Shortbus (U.S.A.) John Cameron Mitchell
 Copying Beethoven (UK/Hungary) Agnieszka Holland
 Bella (U.S.A.) Alejandro Monteverde

Midnight Madness
 Borat: Cultural Learnings of America for Make Benefit Glorious Nation of Kazakhstan (USA) Larry Charles
 Black Sheep (New Zealand) Jonathan King
 All The Boys Love Mandy Lane (USA) Jonathan Levine
 Trapped Ashes (USA/Japan/Canada) Cunningham/Dante/Gaeta/Hellman/Russell
 The Abandoned (Spain) Nacho Cerdà
 The Host (South Korea) Bong Joon-ho
 Severance (UK) Christopher Smith
 Princess (Denmark) Anders Morgenthaler
 S&Man (USA) JT Petty
 Sheitan (France) Kim Chapiron

Vanguard
 Macbeth (Australia) Geoffrey Wright
 Chacun Sa Nuit (France) Pascal Arnold/Jean-Marc Barr
 Jade Warrior (Finland/China/Estonia) Antti-Jussi Annila
 Bunny Chow (South Africa) John Barker
 Shortbus (USA) John Cameron Mitchell
 Renaissance (France/UK/Luxembourg) Christian Volckman
 Election (Hong Kong) Johnnie To
 Election 2 (Hong Kong) Johnnie To
 Drama/Mex (Mexico) Gerardo Naranjo
 2:37 (Australia) Murali K. Thalluri
 Suburban Mayhem (Australia) Paul Goldman
 Sleeping Dogs Lie (USA) Bobcat Goldthwait

Canada First!
 Acts of Imagination, Carolyn Combs
 Cheech, Patrice Sauvé
 La Coupure, Jean Châteauvert
 End of the Line, Maurice Devereaux
 Everything's Gone Green, Paul Fox
 Fido, Andrew Currie
 Mercy, Mazdak Taebi
 On the Trail of Igor Rizzi (Sur la trace d'Igor Rizzi), Noël Mitrani
 A Stone's Throw, Camelia Frieberg

Short Cuts
 À l’ombre, Simon Lavoie
 L’Air de rien, Frédérick Pelletier
 Aruba, Hubert Davis
 The Broken Hearted, Antoinette Karuna
 By the Hour, Bill Marchant
 Christ in Wood, Alexander Winfield
 Cloudbreaker, Adam Garnet Jones
 Couldn't Be Happier, Jackie May
 The Days (Les Jours), Maxime Giroux
 The Dead Water (Les Eaux mortes), Guy Édoin
 The Double Woman, Carla B. Guttmann
 Down Payment on a Dead Horse, Jason Britski
 The Ecstasy Note, Geoffrey Uloth
 Elizabeth, Deco Dawson
 The Eyes of Edward James, Rodrigo Gudiño
 If I See Randy Again Do You Want Me to Hit Him with the Axe?, Vivieno Caldinelli
 Intolerable, Alison Maclean
 The Last Bang, Emmanuel Shirinian
 A Life of Errors, Nicholas Pye and Sheila Pye
 Love Seat, Kris Elgstrand
 The Man Who Waited (L’Homme qui attendait), Theodore Ushev
 Ninth Street Chronicles, Megan Martin
 Nude Caboose, Guy Maddin
 Où est Maurice?, Alek Rzeszowski and Matthew Rankin
 Patterns 2, Jamie Travis
 Patterns 3, Jamie Travis
 Plume, Chelsea McMullan
 Pretty Broken, Cline Mayo
 The Runner, Robert Delaskie
 The Saddest Boy in the World, Jamie Travis
 Saskatchewan Part 3, Brian Stockton
 Screening, Anthony Green
 Starlight Tour, Evan Crowe
 Supposed To, Aleesa Cohene
 Suspect, Patricia Rozema
 Tell Me Everything, Brian D. Johnson
 La Tête haute, Ivan Grbovic
 The Tragic Story of Nling, Jeffrey St. Jules
 True Love, Adam Brodie and Dave Derewlany
 The Wait, Ann Verrall

Canada's Top Ten
TIFF's annual Canada's Top Ten list, its national critics and festival programmers poll of the ten best feature and short films of the year, was released in December 2006.

Away from Her — Sarah Polley
Congorama — Philippe Falardeau
The Journals of Knud Rasmussen — Zacharias Kunuk, Norman Cohn
Manufactured Landscapes — Jennifer Baichwal
Monkey Warfare — Reginald Harkema
On the Trail of Igor Rizzi (Sur la trace d'Igor Rizzi) — Noël Mitrani
Radiant City — Gary Burns, Jim Brown
Sharkwater — Rob Stewart
A Sunday in Kigali (Un dimanche à Kigali) — Robert Favreau
Trailer Park Boys: The Movie — Mike Clattenburg

References

External links

 Official website
 tiffreviews.com
 TIFF 2006 coverage at TheGATE.ca
 2006 Toronto International Film Festival at IMDb

2006
2006 film festivals
2006 in Toronto
2006 in Canadian cinema
2006 festivals in North America